Macbool Alimmohamed Nuhman (born 10 August 1944) is a Sri Lankan linguist and academic. He is a poet, literary critic and translator and has published numerous books.

Early life
Nuhman was born on 10 August 1944 in Kalmunai in south eastern Ceylon. He was educated at Wesley High School in Kalmunai.

Career
After school Nuhman taught in Periya Kinniya before receiving training at Addalaichenai Teachers Training College. He then taught in Polonnaruwa District and Kalmunai. He joined the University of Ceylon, Colombo in 1971, graduating from the University of Sri Lanka in 1973 with a BA and BPhil degree in linguistics.

Nuhman was a lecturer in Tamil and linguistics at the University of Sri Lanka Jaffna campus, and its successor the University of Jaffna, from 1976 to 1990. He received a MA degree from the University of Jaffna in 1982 after producing a thesis on Tamil wordage of Muslims in the Batticaloa region. He received a Ph.D. degree from Annamalai University after producing a research paper titled A Contrastive Study of the Structure of the Noun Phrase in Tamil and Sinhala.

Nuhman joined the University of Peradeniya as a senior lecturer in 1991 and in 2001 he was promoted to professor of Tamil. He was visiting professor in linguistics at Tamil University in Thanjavur. He was also a visiting professor at the University of Malaya and the SIM University. He was an academic consultant for the South Eastern University of Sri Lanka and the Open University of Sri Lanka. He retired in 2009.

Nuhman was a member of the board of directors of the International Centre for Ethnic Studies and the Sri Lanka Rupavahini Corporation. He was a member of the Official Language Commission and the academic board of the National Institute of Language Education and Training. He was a member of the advisory board of the University of Colombo's Centre for Contemporary Indian Studies. He is a member of the advisory board of the Noolaham Foundation.

Works
Nuhman has published more than 30 books including:
  (Grandparents and Grandsons) (Readers Association, 1977)
  (Twentieth Century Eelam Tamil Literature) (Readers Association, 1979; co-authors C. Maunakuru and Chitralekha Maunaguru)
  (Palestinian Poems) (Readers Association, 1981)
  (Immortal Shadows) (Narmada Publishing, 1982)
   (Rainy Days are Coming) (Annam, 1983)
   (Eleven Eelam Poets) (Kalachuvadu, 1984; co-editor A. Yesurasa)
   (Bharathi's Language Ideas: A Linguistic Perspective) (University of Jaffna, 1984)
  (Review Articles) (Annam, 1985)
  (Marxism and Literary Criticism) (1985)
 Communication, Language and Modernization (1993)
   (Basic Tamil Grammar) (Readers Association, 1999)
   (Mahakavi's Three Plays) (National Art Literary Council, 2000)
   (Teaching Tamil Language in Early Intermediate Classes) (Colombo Tamil Association, 2002)
 Lankan Mosaic: Translation of Sinhala and Tamil Short Stories  (Colombo, Three Wheeler Press, 2002; co-editors Ashley Halpe, Ranjini Obeyesekere)
 A Contrastive Grammar of Tamil and Sinhala Noun Phrase (University of Peradeniya, 2003)
 Understanding Sri Lankan Muslim Identity (International Centre for Ethnic Studies, 2004)
   (Language and Literature) (Kalachuvadu, 2006)
 Sri Lankan Muslims: Ethnic Identity within Cultural Diversity (International Centre for Ethnic Studies, 2007)
 Lost Evenings, Lost Lives: Tamil Poets from Sri Lanka's War (Arc Publications, 2015; co-authors V. I. S. Cheran and V. I. S. Jayapalan)

References

1944 births
Academic staff of the University of Jaffna
Academic staff of the University of Peradeniya
Academic staff of the University of Sri Lanka (Jaffna)
Alumni of the University of Jaffna
Alumni of the University of Sri Lanka (Colombo)
Annamalai University alumni
Linguists from Sri Lanka
Living people
People from Kalmunai
Sri Lankan Moor poets
Sri Lankan Moor teachers
Sri Lankan Muslims
Sri Lankan translators
People from British Ceylon